Father William J. Menster (February 10, 1913 – April 14, 2007) was a Roman Catholic priest of the Archdiocese of Dubuque.  Menster was best known as the first member of the clergy to visit Antarctica.

Biography
Born in Cascade, Iowa, Menster was the son of Joseph and Frances Menster.  He attended St. Martin's School in Cascade and Loras College in Dubuque.  Menster studied for the priesthood at St. Mary's Seminary in Cincinnati, Ohio.  Menster was ordained a priest on June 11, 1938.

Fr. Menster was then assigned to be the associate pastor of Sacred Heart Church in Waterloo, Iowa.  During this time Menster joined the United States Naval Reserve, and by 1943 had reached the rank of lieutenant commander.  Following the Second World War, in 1946 Menster was assigned to Operation Highjump – Admiral Richard Byrd's fourth expedition to Antarctica.  He was assigned to the USS Mt. Olympus, and was the only chaplain in the five ship fleet.  In 1947 he became the first Catholic priest ever to set foot on Antarctica, and led the first ever religious service on the continent. During a religious service held in a tent set up on land, he consecrated Antarctica.  Ministering to 2,000 men of a variety of religious faiths gave him experience in leading ecumenical services.

After returning to the United States in 1947, Menster was assigned to Saint Mary's Church in Corwith, Iowa.  Menster was named the director of Catholic Charities in 1948, and held this posting until 1958.  He wrote the book Strong Men South as a chronicle of his adventures in 1949.  He later traveled to Hollywood where he served as a technical consultant when ABC made a documentary about Antarctica named "The Secret Land" - which was based in part on his book.  In 1950 Menster and his father were granted a private audience with Pope Pius XII.  Menster was assigned to be the pastor of St. Patrick's Church in, Monona, St. Mary's in Waverly, and St. John's in Clarion in 1958.  Menster was named the pastor of the St. Donatus parish in 1978.

After the expedition he continued his career in the navy.  During this time he became involved in veteran's work, and served as the national chaplain of the AMVETS organization. After 25 years of service Menster retired as a full Commander.

Menster retired from active ministry, and was living in Dubuque at the time of his death.  At the time of his death, Menster was the oldest living priest in the Archdiocese of Dubuque.

Memoria
Menster Ledge, a geological feature in Antarctica, is named after Menster in his capacity as chaplain, commander, USN of the flagship Mount Olympus.

See also

References

1913 births
2007 deaths
American male non-fiction writers
20th-century American memoirists
History of Antarctica
People of Antarctica
Writers from Dubuque, Iowa
World War II chaplains
United States Navy chaplains
People from Cascade, Iowa
People from Waterloo, Iowa
Christianity in Antarctica
Catholics from Iowa
20th-century American Roman Catholic priests
20th-century American male writers
Military personnel from Iowa